American Handgunner is a magazine dedicated to handguns, handgun hunting, competition shooting, reloading, tactical knives and other shooting-related activities in the United States. It is a sister publication to Guns and American Cop.

The magazine primarily offers reviews on guns, ammunition, knives, and shooting gear; as well as gunsmithing tips, historical articles, gun collecting, self-defense and alerts on gun rights. In addition to those departments, each issue contains a few featured articles and personality profiles of people in the firearms industry as well as press releases of new products.

Staff writers for American Handgunner include Massad Ayoob, John Taffin, Mike Venturino, Pat Covert, Clint Smith, and J. D. Jones.

References

External links
Official Website
Gun Reviews

Bimonthly magazines published in the United States
Firearms magazines
Hunting and fishing magazines
Magazines established in 1976
Magazines published in California
Mass media in San Diego
Sports magazines published in the United States